Fame is a 2009 American musical drama film and a loose remake of the 1980 film of the same name. It was directed by Kevin Tancharoen and written by Allison Burnett. It was released on September 25, 2009 in the United States, Canada, Ireland, and the United Kingdom. The film follows talented high school students attending  The High School of Performing Arts in New York City (known today as Fiorello H. LaGuardia High School), where students get specialized training that often leads to success in the entertainment industry. Exterior shots of the Performing Arts school are of the Professional Performing Arts School or PPAS on West 48th Street and not the Fiorello H. LaGuardia High School on 100 Amsterdam Avenue behind the Lincoln Center.

Debbie Allen, who portrays the school principal Angela Simms, is the only person to appear in the original movie, the subsequent television show (in the 1980 film and the series she played the role of dance teacher Lydia Grant), and this production.

Plot

Auditions
During the opening scenes in auditions and orientation, it is told that in 1936, New York City Mayor Fiorello H. LaGuardia founded the High School of Music & Art in order to provide a facility where the most gifted and talented public school students of New York City could pursue their talents in art or music, while also completing a full academic program of instruction. In 1948, the School of Performing Arts (P.A.) was created to provide training in performance skills to students who wished to prepare for professional careers in dance, music or drama.

Freshman year
Students learn on the first day of classes that their teachers expect them to know everything. In dance class, the teacher Ms. Kraft is worried about Kevin's dancing, but is easily impressed by Alice.

In acting class, Jenny feels uncomfortable to let loose and be crazy like everyone else. In music class, Mr. Cranston gives Victor pointers, while Denise plays the music perfectly on the piano.

In the lunchroom, everyone practices their major and they all get up and dance ('This Is My Life'), while Denise and Malik escape the madness and they talk to each other, Denise saying that her uptight and conservative parents thinks that the school is "people sitting around, practicing cello all day", and that they would die if they saw this. Malik reveals that his mother doesn't even know that he is coming to the school because she works three jobs and would never notice.

Just before freshman year ends, it shows Malik at his apartment, his mother finding his report card, making it clear that he goes to Performing Arts. She is angry but he continues to go to the school. The year closes after she goes to work and leaves Malik standing alone.

Sophomore year
As the new school year begins, it shows the dancers all practicing in a circle, but once it is Kevin's turn, he is out-shone and is forced to go back in his original spot.

In music class, Victor is having trouble sticking to the right music, and adds his own spin on whatever he is playing, which doesn't sit well with Mr. Cranston.

In theater class, Malik talks about his dead sister, Ayanna, causing Mr. Dowd to ask questions that he refuses to answer. Malik then leaves, stating that he's going to be famous, no matter what anyone else says.

Meanwhile, Denise is playing her classical piano, but then starts to sing, assuming she is alone. ('Out Here on My Own') When she leaves, it is revealed to the audience that Malik was watching the whole time. He brings her to Victor and convinces her to sing for the album that they are producing. She agrees to it, as long as her strict father doesn't find out.

At a Halloween party, Malik plays the song, but says the vocals are "anonymous", upsetting Denise, which confuses Malik. Later, Joy is in Central Park drinking beer. She gets up and does a rap, vomiting at the end of it. Neil captures this in his documentary and presents it to the class. Marco asks Jenny out on a date (though not for the first time). She agrees to go with him to dinner at his father's restaurant, where she convinces him to play a song and sing on the piano. He does ('Try'), and she gives him a money tip. The sophomore year ends with them kissing.

Junior year
Joy has another audition, but is annoyed, because the other girls competing against her always seem to get the part. Neil says that he is meeting with a producer for a short, independent film he wrote and hopes to direct himself.

Meanwhile, Marco and Jenny go to a party, where Jenny sees a guy named Andy Matthews, a former P.A. student who claims to be a professional actor and known player. He tells her that he can have her meet with his agent, and the naive Jenny gives him her cell phone number. Marco leaves, having seen the last part, and Jenny runs out after him. They have a minor fight, but she promises that she will never talk to Andy again, and they go back to her house.

Victor, Malik, and Denise meet with a man from a record company, who says that their demo is interesting, and he will play it at the next meeting and get back to them. Victor and Malik are overjoyed, but Denise is still hesitant. At the next meeting, the producer tells them that Denise is the reason he was interested in their music. He tries to persuade her to stay.

Joy tells Jenny and Neil that she got a part-time acting job on 'Sesame Street' and is very excited about it. Ms. Rowan, the voice teacher, takes some of the students to a karaoke bar where she ends up singing as well. Jenny goes to meet Andy despite what she said to Marco. When she arrives, Andy tells her the director is out sick. He comes onto her, but she stops him and angrily leaves. She tells Marco, and he asks if Andy tried anything, saying that he knew this would happen and that if fame was really that important to her then he hopes she gets the job. He then leaves her sobbing his name on a rooftop.

Neil tries to get his equipment for the movie, but when he tries to find his producer, he is discovered to be gone, along with the $5,000.

Senior year
Kevin (Paul McGill) has a meeting with Ms. Kraft, the dance teacher, because he asked her to write him a letter of recommendation. She says she can not write him the letter, because she believes he is not talented enough to become a professional dancer. Meanwhile, as they talk, Alice is dancing to ('Black and Gold') practicing her jazz piece. This conversation with Ms. Kraft causes him to attempt suicide by stepping in front of a subway car. Joy, Rosie, and Jenny are there to stop him.

Victor is told by his girlfriend, Alice, that she is going on a world tour next week. He asks if she will visit him, but she says that after P.A. couples usually go their separate ways.

Joy drops out of school before graduation because she is working on 'Sesame Street' full-time now and her grades have suffered.

Malik talks with Mr. Dowd about his father, which leads to Mr. Dowd telling him about breaking down his walls. Victor, Malik and Denise put on a hip-hop concert at a club at which her parents are at, but Denise told them it was classical jazz because of her father's wishes for her to pursue classical piano and not vocals. Despite this, she defies her father and goes on anyway and wins over her mother during the performance. Marco, along with Neil, Joy, and Rosie, is there to watch but when he sees Jenny come in, he says he has to go. Jenny stops him from leaving, saying that she's been thinking a lot about him, and that it kills her that she hurt him.

Later, during the concert, he puts his arms around her and they smile at each other. When Denise leaves with her parents, her father is outraged and tells her that he is pulling her out of P.A., even though she is about to graduate. Her mom stops him and says that if Denise wants to sing, she should sing.

Graduation
Before graduation, Jenny gives a speech about success to the graduating class, saying that she felt it when she was in the school. Kevin tells Joy that he is moving back to Iowa (following the advice Ms. Kraft gave to him), and that he is going to be "the best god damn dance teacher there ever was". During the graduation performance, everybody participates ('Hold Your Dream'), with Denise as the main singer. It ends with all the characters following graduating (except Joy and Alice).

Cast
The main cast is featured on the official website.
Students

 Collins Pennie as Malik Washburn
 Kay Panabaker as Jenny Garrison
 Asher Book as Marco Ramonte
 Paul Iacono as Neil Baczynsky
 Naturi Naughton as Denise Dupree
 Anna Maria Perez de Tagle as Joy Moy
 Paul McGill as Kevin Barrett
 Kherington Payne as Alice Ellerton
 Walter Perez as Victor Tavares
 Kristy Flores as Rosie Martinez

Teachers and staff

 Debbie Allen as Principal Angela Simms
 Charles S. Dutton as Mr. Alvin Dowd
 Bebe Neuwirth as Ms. Lynn Kraft
 Megan Mullally as Ms. Fran Rowan
 Kelsey Grammer as Mr. Joel Cranston

Other characters

 Cody Longo as Andy Matthews
 Dale Godboldo as Music executive
 Michael Hyatt as Mrs. Washburn
 James Read and Laura Johnson as Mr. and Mrs. Ellerton
 Julius Tennon and April Grace as Mr. and Mrs. Dupree
 Howard Gutman as Mr. Baczynsky
 Ryan Surratt as Eddie
 Marcus Hopson as Face
 Johanna Braddy as Katie

Release

Critical response

Fame has received generally unfavorable reviews from critics. Rotten Tomatoes reported that 24% of critics gave the film positive reviews based on 121 reviews with an average score of 4.4/10. The site's consensus states: "Fame is ultimately undone by its choppy editing, its incomplete characterizations, and its apparent desire to appeal to the High School Musical generation." Based on 26 critical reviews sampled by Metacritic, it gave an average score of 39% for the film. On At the Movies, Michael Phillips gave the film a "See It" while A.O. Scott gave the film a "Skip It".  Parker voiced his disapproval of the remake and described it as an "awful" film. Maureen Teefy also criticized the film, stating, "They're using the same formula, but it doesn't have the same substance. It's not staying true to the grittiness and authenticity of the original."

Box office
Fame opened at third place behind Cloudy with a Chance of Meatballs and the newly released Surrogates with approximately $10,011,682. The film has grossed $22,455,510 domestically and $50,930,003 in the foreign market with an international gross of $73,385,513, making it a moderate box office success.

Soundtrack
The soundtrack was released on August 25, 2009. It features a blend of American standards and new pieces, written specifically for the movie. Included from the original film are the piano ballad "Out Here on My Own" and the title theme "Fame" (both sung by Irene Cara for the 1980 original film). There's a version of the theme song with a verse by Collins Pennie, but didn't make the album, although it was included in The Radio Mixes EP of the song and there was made a music video for it to promote the film.

Track listing

 "Welcome to P.A." – Raney Shockne
 "Fame" – Naturi Naughton
 "Big Things" – Anjulie
 "Ordinary People" – Asher Book
 "This Is My Life" – Hopsin, Ak'Sent, Tynisha Keli & Donte "Burger" Winston
 "Out Here on My Own" – Naturi Naughton
 "Street Hustlin'" – Raney Shockne feat. Stella Moon
 "You'll Find a Way" (Switch & Sinden Remix) – Santigold
 "Can't Hide from Love" – Naturi Naughton & Collins Pennie
 "Black & Gold" – Sam Sparro
 "Back to Back" – Collins Pennie feat. Ashleigh Haney
 "I Put a Spell on You" – Raney Shockne feat. Eddie Wakes
 "Get On the Floor" – Naturi Naughton & Collins Pennie
 "Try" – Asher Book
 "You Took Advantage of Me" – Megan Mullally
 "Too Many Women" (Damon Elliott Remix) – Rachael Sage
 "Someone to Watch Over Me" – Asher Book
 "You Made Me Love You" – Raney Shockne feat. Oren Waters
 "Hold Your Dream" – Kay Panabaker, Asher Book & Naturi Naughton

Additionally, a More Music From Fame and two solo albums by Naturi Naughton and Collins Pennie titled Fame Presents Naturi Naughton as Denise: Didn't I Tell You? and Fame Presents Collins Pennie as Malik: Best Believe That were released in February 2010.

Charts

References

External links

 
 
 
 

Fame (franchise)
2009 films
2000s dance films
2000s musical drama films
2000s teen drama films
American dance films
American musical drama films
American teen drama films
Films produced by Gary Lucchesi
Films scored by Mark Isham
Films set in Manhattan
Films shot in New York City
Lakeshore Entertainment films
Metro-Goldwyn-Mayer films
Musical film remakes
United Artists films
2009 directorial debut films
2009 drama films
Works about performing arts education
2000s English-language films
Films directed by Kevin Tancharoen
2000s American films